Pseudagrion kibalense is a species of damselfly in the family Coenagrionidae. It is found in Angola, Central African Republic, the Republic of the Congo, the Democratic Republic of the Congo, Equatorial Guinea, Gabon, Kenya, Uganda, Zambia, and Zimbabwe. Its natural habitats are subtropical or tropical moist lowland forests and rivers.

References

Coenagrionidae
Insects described in 1959
Taxonomy articles created by Polbot